Femi Adesina OON is a Nigerian journalist who served as the Special Adviser, Media and Publicity to the  President of the Federal Republic of Nigeria, Muhammadu Buhari.

Education 
Adesina attended Obafemi Awolowo University Osun, State and then he was at Lagos Business School.

Career 
Femi Adesina started his career in journalism as a writer for Radio Lagos, he then later joined Vanguard Newspapers.
Adesina wrote for Vanguard Newspapers and National Concord Newspapers before joining The Sun Newspaper, where he rose to editor-in-chief. He also served a two-year term as president of the Nigerian board of Editors. Although re-elected for a second term as Guild president, Adesina stepped down after receiving his government appointment. He also stepped down as editor-in-chief of The Sun. Adesina was sworn in as special adviser on media and publicity to Buhari on August 31, 2015.

Awards 
He was named Editor of the Year for 2007 by the Nigeria Media Merit Awards.

In October 2022, Adesina was conferred with a Nigerian national honour of the Officer of the Order of the Niger (OON) by president Muhammadu Buhari.

References 

Living people
Year of birth missing (living people)
Place of birth missing (living people)
Nigerian newspaper journalists